The IP network multipathing or IPMP is a facility provided by Solaris to provide fault-tolerance and load spreading for network interface cards (NICs). With IPMP, two or more NICs are dedicated for each network to which the host connects. Each interface can be assigned a static "test" IP address, which is used to assess the operational state of the interface. Each virtual IP address is assigned to an interface, though there may be more interfaces than virtual IP addresses, some of the interfaces being purely for standby purposes. When the failure of an interface is detected its virtual IP addresses are swapped to an operational interface in the group.

The IPMP load spreading feature increases the machine's bandwidth by spreading the outbound load between all the cards in the same IPMP group.

in.mpathd is the daemon in the Solaris OS responsible for IPMP functionality.

See also 
Multihoming
Multipath routing
Multipath TCP
Common Address Redundancy Protocol

External links 
 Enterprise Networking Article, February 2, 2006
 Introducing IPMP - Oracle Solaris 11
 IPMP section from Sun Solaris 10 System Administration Guide

Networking standards
Sun Microsystems software